William Tatem Tilden II (February 10, 1893 – June 5, 1953), nicknamed "Big Bill", was an American tennis player. Tilden was the world No. 1 amateur for six consecutive years, from 1920 to 1925, and was ranked as the world No. 1 professional by Ray Bowers in 1931 and 1932 and Ellsworth Vines in 1933. He won 14 Major singles titles, including 10 Grand Slam events, one World Hard Court Championships and three professional majors. He was the first American man to win Wimbledon, taking the title in 1920. He also won a joint-record seven U.S. Championships titles (shared with Richard Sears and Bill Larned).

Tilden dominated the world of international tennis in the first half of the 1920s, and during his 20-year amateur period from 1911 to 1930, won 138 of 192 tournaments he contested. He owns a number of all-time tennis achievements, including the career match-winning record and the career winning percentage at the U.S. Championships. At the 1929 U.S. National Championships, Tilden became the first player to reach ten finals at the same Grand Slam event. Tilden, who was frequently at odds with the rigid United States Lawn Tennis Association about his amateur status and income derived from newspaper articles, won his last Major title in 1930 at Wimbledon aged 37. He turned professional at the end of that year and toured with other professionals for the next 15 years.

Personal life
William Tatem Tilden Jr.  was born on February 10, 1893, in Germantown, Philadelphia into a wealthy family bereaved by the death of three older siblings. His father was William Tatem Tilden, a wool merchant and local politician; and his mother, Selina Hey, was a pianist. His semi-invalid mother, who suffered from Bright's disease, died when he was 18; and, even though his father was still alive and maintained a large house staffed with servants, Bill was sent a few houses away to live with a maiden aunt. The loss at 22 of his father and an older brother Herbert marked him deeply. After several months of deep depression and, with encouragement from his aunt, tennis, which he had taken up at age six or seven at the family summer house in the Catskill Mountains, became his primary means of recovery. According to his biographer, Frank Deford, because of his early family losses, Tilden spent all of his adult life attempting to create a father-son relationship with a long succession of ball boys and youthful tennis protégés, of whom Vinnie Richards was the most noted. In spite of his worldwide travels, Tilden lived at his aunt's house until 1941, when he was 48 years old.

Tilden was initially home-schooled by his overprotective mother and a team of private tutors; but, in 1908, he went to Germantown Academy. In October 1910 he entered the University of Pennsylvania, where he joined Delta Kappa Epsilon, and enrolled at Peirce College but did not graduate.

Early and amateur tennis career

Tilden went to the prep school Germantown Academy where he wasn't known for his tennis nor was he eventually good enough to play on his college team. The shy, self-absorbed, sometimes arrogant young man dropped out of the University of Pennsylvania and in 1910 began to practice his game against a backboard, and he also became a dedicated student of the game. The following year he won his first tournaments; the junior singles and doubles title of Germantown. In just three years, he worked his way up the ranks. His first national title was winning the mixed doubles championships with Mary Browne in 1913 and they successfully defended the title in 1914.

From 1914 to 1917, Tilden won the Philadelphia championship. Prior to 1920, he had won a number of Canadian doubles titles, but at the U.S. National Championships in 1918 and 1919 he lost the singles final to Robert Lindley Murray and "Little Bill" Johnston, respectively in straight sets. He won six consecutive U.S. singles championships from 1920 to 1925 and seven in total, making him the co-record holder with Richard Sears and Bill Larned. In the winter of 1919–1920, he moved to Rhode Island, where, on an indoor court, he devoted himself to remodeling his relatively ineffective backhand into a much more effective one. With this change, he became the world No. 1 tennis player and the first male American to win the Wimbledon singles championship. In the mid-1920s, Tilden came into conflict with the USLTA regarding alleged violations of the amateur rule, specifically relating to the monetary compensation he received for writing tennis articles.

In the late 1920s, the great French players known as the "Four Musketeers" finally wrested the Davis Cup away from Tilden and the United States, as well as his domination of the singles titles at Wimbledon and Forest Hills. In 1928, he won the men's singles in the Ojai Tennis Tournament. Tilden had long been at odds with the rigid amateur directors of the United States Lawn Tennis Association about his income derived from newspaper articles about tennis. He won his last major championship at Wimbledon in 1930 at the age of 37, but was no longer able to win titles at will.

Professional tennis career
On December 31, 1930, in need of money, he turned professional and joined the fledgling pro tour, which had begun only in 1927. For the next 15 years, he and a handful of other professionals such as Hans Nüsslein and Karel Koželuh barnstormed across the United States and Europe in a series of one-night stands, with Tilden still the player that people primarily paid to see. Tilden beat Koželuh 50–17 on the 1931 tour. Even with greats such as Ellsworth Vines, Fred Perry, and Don Budge as his opponents, all of them current or recent world No. 1 players, it was often Tilden who ensured the box-office receipts—and who could still hold his own against the much younger players for a first set or even an occasional match. Tilden was ranked world No. 1 pro by Ray Bowers in 1931 and 1932 and Ellsworth Vines in 1933.

Tilden thought he reached the apogee of his whole career in 1934 at 41 years old; nevertheless, that year he was dominated in the pro ranks by Ellsworth Vines. American Lawn Tennis reported that Vines had an edge of 11–9 in the first phase of their tour from January 10 through February 16 and that Vines led Tilden by 19 matches after the second phase of their tour, played from March 21 through May 17. Tilden had won 17 times for the entire year, per an Associated Press report, so a probable win–loss record at tour's end was 36–17 in Vines' favor. Both players then met at least 6 times during the rest of the year (Ray Bowers has listed 5 tournament matches and 1 one-night program), all lost by Tilden.

In 1931, Tilden won his first U.S. Pro title, beating Vincent Richards in the final in straight sets at the Forest Hill Stadium in New York. In 1935, he took his second US Pro title beating Kozeluh in the final. Tilden also won the French Pro title in 1934. By the late 1930s, Tilden was in his mid 40s and past his prime, but he was capable of playing excellent tennis in patches. Tilden lost easily to Don Budge in the 1941 World Series. Budge said of Tilden "Bill could invariably manage to keep things close for a while. It was seldom, however, that he could extend me to the end, and I swamped him on the whole tour".

In 1945, the 52-year-old Tilden and his long-time doubles partner Vinnie Richards won the professional doubles championship—they had won the United States amateur title 27 years earlier in 1918.

After playing the pro tournament circuit in 1946, the 53-year-old Tilden served a jail term. He returned to pro tennis briefly in 1948, playing a short series of matches against Wayne Sabin. Tilden's final farewell came in 1951. He faced George Lyttleton Rogers in a tour in April and May. Tilden lost in the quarterfinals to Frank Kovacs at the Cleveland tournament in June 1951. Tilden was 58 years old. It had been 35 years earlier, in 1916, that he had made his singles debut at the US (Amateur) championships.

Davis Cup coach
Tilden coached Germany's tennis team in the 1937 Davis Cup. In the inter-zone finals, the U.S. team won after the deciding singles clash between Gottfried von Cramm and Don Budge, a match which has been called "The Greatest Tennis Match Ever Played".

Place in sports history
Tilden often is considered one of the greatest tennis players of all time.
Allison Danzig, the main tennis writer for The New York Times from 1923 through 1968, and the editor of The Fireside Book of Tennis, called Tilden the greatest tennis player he had ever seen. "He could run like a deer," Danzig once told CBS Sports. An extended Danzig encomium to Tilden's tennis appears in the July 11, 1946 issue of The Times, in which he reports on a 1920s-evoking performance in the first two sets of a five-set loss by the 53-year-old Tilden to Wayne Sabin, at the 1946 Professional Championship at Forest Hills.

In 1975, Don Budge ranked his top five players of all time and rated Tilden number four behind Vines, Kramer and Perry.

In his 1979 autobiography, Jack Kramer, the long-time tennis promoter and great player, included Tilden in his list of the six greatest players of all time. Kramer began playing tennis with Tilden at age 15 at the Los Angeles Tennis Club (LATC).

In 1983, Fred Perry ranked the greatest male players of all time and put them in to two categories, before World War 2 and after.  Perry ranked Tilden number one in the pre-World War 2 list.

In the early years of the 21st century, Sidney Wood compiled his list of the Greatest Players of All Time (later published posthumously in a memoir "The Wimbledon final that never was and other tennis tales from a bygone era").  Wood first entered Wimbledon in 1927 and won the title in 1931.  "From that time on, through to the late 1970s (doubles only towards the end), I was privileged to compete against virtually every top player in the world" said Wood.  Wood ranked Tilden number three, behind Budge and Kramer.

Tilden was one of the most famous athletes in the world for many years. During his lifetime he was a flamboyant character who was never out of the public eye, acting in both movies and plays, as well as playing tennis. He also had two arrests for sexual misconduct with teenage boys in the late 1940s; these led to incarcerations in the Los Angeles area. After his convictions he was shunned in public. Philadelphia's Germantown Cricket Club, his home court, revoked his membership and took down his portrait. Tilden's criminal record has cast a long shadow: in March 2016, a proposal to honor him with a historical marker at the club was voted down by the state of Pennsylvania panel charged with evaluating nominations. In 1950, in spite of his legal record and public disgrace, an Associated Press poll named Tilden the greatest tennis player of the half-century by a wider margin than that given to any athlete in any other sport (310 out of 391 votes). He was inducted into the International Tennis Hall of Fame in 1959.

In the United States' sports-mad decade of the Roaring Twenties, Tilden was one of the six dominant figures of the "Golden Age of Sport", along with Babe Ruth, Howie Morenz, Red Grange, Bobby Jones, and Jack Dempsey.

Sexuality and morals charges
Tilden was arrested in November 1946 on Sunset Boulevard by the Beverly Hills police and charged with a misdemeanor ("contributing to the delinquency of a minor") for soliciting an underage male, a 14-year-old boy with whom he was having sex in a moving vehicle. Tilden did not carry his glasses with him and signed a confession without reading it. He was sentenced to a year in prison, but served 7½ months. His five-year parole conditions were so strict they virtually erased all his income from private lessons. He was arrested again in January 1949 after picking up a 16-year-old hitchhiker who remained anonymous until years later when he filed a lawsuit claiming he had suffered severe mental, physical, and emotional damage from the encounter. The judge sentenced Tilden to a year on probation violation and let the punishment for the charge run concurrently. Tilden served 10 months.

In both cases, he apparently sincerely believed that his celebrity and his longtime friendship with Hollywood names such as Charlie Chaplin were enough to keep him from jail. He therefore defended himself in court in both cases in a far less than vigorous fashion. After his incarceration, he was increasingly shunned by the tennis and Hollywood world. He was unable to give lessons at most clubs, and even on public courts, he had fewer clients. At one point, he was invited to play at a prestigious professional tournament being held at the Beverly Wilshire Hotel; at the last moment, he was told that he could not participate. Chaplin allowed Tilden to use his private court for lessons to help him after the run of legal and financial problems.

According to contemporary George Lott, a player and later tennis coach at DePaul University, and authoritative biographer Frank Deford, Tilden never made advances to players, whether other adults or his pupils. Art Anderson of Burbank, who took lessons from Tilden from the age of 11 and remained a lifelong loyal friend, reported that Tilden never made advances toward him. “Bill had all the rumors floating around about his sexuality,” Jack Kramer said. Questions remain if Tilden's prosecution was based on the rumors, many published, and homophobic stereotypes. California did not repeal its sodomy law until 1976. Because he lived in an era when homosexual sex was illegal and was not tolerated socially, some suspect that Tilden was a victim of the homophobic society of the era. More shocking than Tilden's being caught was the revelation that "sports and homosexuality were not mutually exclusive".

Death
Tilden had been born to wealth, and he earned large sums of money during his long career, particularly in his early years on the pro tour; he spent it lavishly, keeping a suite at the Algonquin Hotel in New York City. Much of his income went toward financing Broadway shows that he wrote, produced, and starred in. The latter part of his life was spent quietly and away from his family, occasionally participating in celebrity tennis matches. He died in his apartment at 2025 North Argyle in Los Angeles, California. He was preparing to leave for the United States Professional Championship tournament in Cleveland, Ohio in 1953 when he died from heart complications at age 60. Tilden is buried in Ivy Hill Cemetery in Philadelphia.

Tilden was inducted into the International Tennis Hall of Fame in Newport, Rhode Island in 1959.

Career statistics

Bud Collins states that, as an amateur (1912–1930), Tilden won 138 of 192 tournaments, lost 28 finals and had a 907–62 match record, a 93.6% winning percentage. Although he never played at the Australian Championships, Tilden was the first male tennis player to win four consecutive Grand Slam titles. In 1921, the Australian Championships were held after the U.S. National Championships. He joined professional tennis in 1931, making him then ineligible to compete in Grand Slam tournaments. He owns a number of all-time tennis achievements, including an amateur career match-winning record of 93.6%.

Tilden's career winning percentage at the US National Championships was 90.7%, which ranks him first ahead of Roger Federer, Fred Perry and Pete Sampras, and also a 42-match win streak from 1920 to 1926 is ahead of Roger Federer and Ivan Lendl. His 95-match winning streak from 1924 to 1925 is ahead of Don Budge and Roy Emerson, and his best win–loss single season coming in 1925 at 98.73%, 78-1, places him ahead of John McEnroe and Jimmy Connors. He, Roger Federer, and Rafael Nadal are the only players to reach 10 finals at a single Grand Slam event. At the Wimbledon Championships, he recorded a career 91.2% match record, ranking him 3rd all-time behind Björn Borg and Don Budge.

Performance timeline

Events with a challenge round: (WC) won; (CR) lost the challenge round; (FA) all comers' finalist.

Records

All-time records

See also
 List of male tennis players
 Tennis male players statistics
 All-time tennis records – men's singles

Notes

References

Sources

  
 
 
 Fisher, Marshall Jon (2010) A Terrible Splendor: Three Extraordinary Men, a World Poised for War, and the Greatest Tennis Match Ever Played. New York: Random House. 
 
 
 Hofler, Robert (2006) The Man Who Invented Rock Hudson: The Pretty Boys and Dirty Deals of Henry Willson. New York: Carroll & Graf. 
 Kashner, Sam and Macnair, Jennifer (2003) The Bad and the Beautiful: Hollywood in the Fifties. New York: W. W. Norton & Company. 
 
 Milton, Joyce (1998) Tramp: The Life of Charlie Chaplin New York: Da Capo Press. 
 Mulloy, Gardner (2009) As It Was. Flexigroup. 
 Riggs, Bobby (1949) Tennis is my Racket. Stanley Paul & Co.
 Seebohm, Caroline (2009) Little Pancho: The Life of Tennis Legend Pancho Segura. Lincoln, Nebraska: University of Nebraska Press. 
 Skeen, Dick (1976) Tennis Champions are Made, not Born. Cal-Pacific Color.

External links

 
 
 
 
 
 

1893 births
1953 deaths
American male tennis players
French Championships (tennis) champions
Gay sportsmen
Sportspeople from Manhattan
International Tennis Hall of Fame inductees
LGBT tennis players
American LGBT sportspeople
LGBT people from Pennsylvania
Tennis people from New York (state)
Tennis players from Philadelphia
University of Pennsylvania alumni
United States National champions (tennis)
Wimbledon champions (pre-Open Era)
Grand Slam (tennis) champions in men's singles
Grand Slam (tennis) champions in mixed doubles
Grand Slam (tennis) champions in men's doubles
Tennis writers
Germantown Academy alumni
Professional tennis players before the Open Era
Burials at Ivy Hill Cemetery (Philadelphia)
20th-century American LGBT people
World number 1 ranked male tennis players
Professional tennis promoters